The Government Degree College, Pulwama also known as GDC Pulwama, is a college located on a 66 kanal campus in Pulwama in the Indian union territory of Jammu and Kashmir. It was established in the year 1986. It is affiliated to University of Kashmir, and is recognised by UGC under 2(f) and 12(b) of UGC Act 1956.The college is accredited A by NAAC.

Location 
The college is presently spread over 66 kanal of land through which a perennial fresh water stream flows bestowing scenic beauty to the campus.

Establishment 
Department of Higher Education Govt. of J&K established the college under the Chief-Ministership of Dr. Farooq Abdullah in the year 1986.

Overview and history 
GDC Pulwama started its academic operations in the year 1986,from middle school Pulwama for 15 years. It started with a few Arts subjects at that time. As many as 252 students were enrolled for academic session 1986. The college was shifted to the present campus in May 2001. Degree College Pulwama is one of the biggest colleges in the J&K State enrolling more than 6000 students for an academic year.

Courses 
The college offers bachelor courses at undergraduate level in four streams: Science, Arts, Social Science and Commerce. Besides these, bachelors course in Computer Applications for which selection is made through written test conducted by the University of Kashmir is also offered.

Bachelor Courses 

 Bachelor of Arts
 Bachelor of Science (Medical)
 Bachelor of Science (Non Medical)
 Bachelor of Commerce
 Bachelor of Computer Applications
 Bachelor of Business Administration

References 

Degree colleges in Kashmir Division
Universities and colleges in Jammu and Kashmir
University of Kashmir
1986 establishments in Jammu and Kashmir
Educational institutions established in 1986